Earle Brucker may refer to:
Earle Brucker Sr. (1901–1981), Major League Baseball catcher and manager
Earle Brucker Jr. (1925–2009), Major League Baseball catcher